The Cheekye River is a river in southwestern British Columbia, Canada. It flows west into the Cheakamus River and north of Squamish.

References

Rivers of the Pacific Ranges
Sea-to-Sky Corridor
New Westminster Land District